Cap Skirring Airport  is an airport serving Cap Skirring (also spelled Cap Skiring), a town in the Ziguinchor (also known as Basse Casamance) region of Senegal.

Airlines and destinations

Paris Orly Transavia

References

External links
 
 

Airports in Senegal
Ziguinchor Region